Tehuana is a genus of crabs in the family Pseudothelphusidae, containing the following species:
 Tehuana chontalpaensis Villalobos & Alvarez, 2003
 Tehuana complanata (Rathbun, 1905)
 Tehuana diabolis (Pretzmann, 1978)
 Tehuana guerreroensis (Rathbun, 1933)
 Tehuana jacatepecensis Villalobos & Alvarez, 2003
 Tehuana lamellifrons (Rathbun, 1893)
 Tehuana lamothei Alvarez & Villalobos, 1994
 Tehuana poglayenora (Pretzmann, 1978)
 Tehuana veracruzana Rodríguez & Smalley, 1969

References

Pseudothelphusidae